Charles Eng (date of birth unknown, died December 23, 1907) was an American wrestler. He competed in the men's freestyle lightweight at the 1904 Summer Olympics.

References

External links
 

Year of birth missing
1907 deaths
American male sport wrestlers
Olympic wrestlers of the United States
Wrestlers at the 1904 Summer Olympics
Place of birth missing